"The Path of True Love" is an episode of the BBC sitcom, The Green Green Grass. It was screened on 8 January 2009, as the first episode of the fourth series.

Synopsis

The staff easily notice that all is not well at Winterdown Farm. Boycie's lack of attention-giving is upsetting Marlene so much that she feels unloved, under-valued and extremely lonely. With worries floating through her head that their marriage may be coming to a close she seeks the help of the local marriage guidance counsellor. When Boycie finds out that their private problems are being spread about the village by no other than his own wife! However, he soon finds out not to confront her as her depression transforms into fury and she throws him out.

Meanwhile, the pub is being repaired after a huge fireball, a farmers' convention is taking up all the space at the local hotel and Boycie's car has found its own way into a pond – so Boycie remains homeless. Until Bryan offers him a bed that is, although he will have to sleep on the floor as a sick sheep is in the bed. Priorities! Also, Marlene has a girlie chat with Mrs Cakeworthy.

Episode cast

Production, broadcast and reception

Continuity
 Bryan has a new caravan after his last one caught fire in "But is it Art?" (2007).
 Tyler returns from University after leaving in Series Three.
 Mrs Cakeworthy makes reference to her husband, Colin, last seen in "From Here to Paternity" (2006).
 Bryan makes reference to his ex-girlfriend, Myrtle, as he frequently does.
 Elgin's liking for Marlene is exposed once again.
 References to Boycie’s infertility (dating back to Only Fools and Horses) are made.

Conception
The title for this episode is taken from an episode of John Sullivan's hit comedy series, Citizen Smith. The episode, though, bears no resemblance to the Citizen Smith episode. See: List of Citizen Smith episodes.

The episode seems to have been based on the idea that both Boycie and Marlene are always at each other's throats, so this episode was written to explore what would have if they actually did break up after a row.

Filming and cast
This episode was filmed in late 2008 at Teddington Studios. The episode features only the main characters displayed above in the cast list. Regulars do not feature. Other characters such as Colin Cakeworthy are made reference to but not do feature.

Errors
 There are no spotted errors within this episode.

References

 British TV Comedy Guide for The Green Green Grass
 BARB viewing figures

2009 British television episodes
The Green Green Grass episodes